A Master of Craft is a 1922 British silent comedy film directed by Thomas Bentley and starring Fred Groves, Mercy Hatton and Judd Green. It was based on a 1900 novel by W. W. Jacobs.

Cast
 Fred Groves - Captain Flower
 Mercy Hatton - Matilda Tapping
 Judd Green - George
 Arthur Cleave - Joe
 John Kelt - Green
 Roy Byford - Pat
 F. Pope Stamper - Mate
 Lilian Douglas
 Jerrold Robertshaw
 Eva Westlake
 Ian Wilson

References

External links
 

1922 films
British comedy films
British silent feature films
1920s English-language films
Films directed by Thomas Bentley
Films based on British novels
Films based on works by W. W. Jacobs
Ideal Film Company films
British black-and-white films
1922 comedy films
1920s British films
Silent comedy films